North Lindenhurst is a hamlet (and census-designated place) in Suffolk County, New York, United States. The population was 11,652 at the 2010 census. It is a community in the Town of Babylon. Most of North Lindenhurst is served by the Lindenhurst Post Office and School District, so it is usually considered a part of the Lindenhurst community.

Geography
North Lindenhurst is bordered by North Amityville to the west, East Farmingdale to the northwest, West Babylon to the northeast, and the Village of Lindenhurst to the south. Its coordinates are  (40.706966, -73.385011).

Demographics

As of the census of 2010, there were 11,652 people and 3,787 households, with 3.09 persons per household in the CDP. The population density was 6,068.8 per square mile (2,391.2/km2).

There were 3,898 housing units, of which 23.8% were in multi-unit structures. The homeownership rate was 76.2%. The median value of owner-occupied housing units was $370,100. 2.8% of housing units were vacant and 30.6% of occupied housing units were occupied by renters.

The racial makeup of the CDP was 81.5% White, 5.1% African American, 0.3% Native American, 3.1% Asian, 0.0% Pacific Islander, 7.1% from other races, and 2.8% from two or more races. Hispanic or Latino of any race were 19.3% of the population. The CDP was 71.1% non-Hispanic White.

There were 3,787 households, out of which 40.0% had children under the age of 18 living with them, 55.7% were married couples living together, 13.5% had a female householder with no husband present, and 23.8% were non-families. 19.0% of all households were made up of individuals, and 7.8% had someone living alone who was 65 years of age or older. The average household size was 3.07 and the average family size was 3.47.

In the CDP, the population was spread out, with 6.2% under the age of 5, 23.7% under the age of 18, 3.3% from 20 to 24, 28.1% from 25 to 44, 77.9% from 45 to 64, and 11.0% who were 65 years of age or older. The median age was 38.0 years.

95.4% of the population had lived in the same house 1 year & over. 19.8% of the population were foreign born, and 25.5% of residents at least 5 years old spoke a language other than English at home.

85.7% of residents at least 25 years old had graduated high school and 16.2% of residents at least 25 years old had a bachelor's degree or higher. The mean travel time to work for workers aged 16 and over was 25.8 minutes.

The median income for a household in the CDP was $74,510. The per capita income for the CDP was $28,604. 3.9% of the population were below the poverty line.

Public schools
Most of North Lindenhurst is served by the Lindenhurst Union Free School District. About one-eighth of the land area is served by the Copiague Union Free School District; however, this area only has three residential blocks. These blocks, located off of Albany Avenue, are all served by the Amityville Post Office, so the area may be thought of as North Amityville. Another, even smaller, portion of North Lindenhurst is served by the Farmingdale Union Free School District; however, this area has no residential blocks.

William Rall School is the only public school in North Lindenhurst, it serves most elementary students of the hamlet; however, areas southeast of Straight Path and west of Wellwood Avenue are zoned to Albany Avenue School, and areas east of Wellwood Avenue and south of Sunrise Highway are zoned to Daniel Street School.

References

Census-designated places in New York (state)
Babylon (town), New York
Hamlets in New York (state)
Census-designated places in Suffolk County, New York
Hamlets in Suffolk County, New York